Westerlee is the name of several locations in the Netherlands:

 Westerlee (Groningen)
 Westerlee (South Holland)